Khadheeja Ibrahim Didi is a Maldivian film actress.

Career
Khadheeja Ibrahim Didi appeared in Abdul Faththaah's horror film Eynaa, released in 2004, with Sheela Najeeb, Mohamed Manik, Ahmed Shah, Ibrahim Jihad and Nashidha Mohamed as one of six colleagues who go on a picnic to a haunted uninhabited island and face a battle for survival. The film garnered critical appreciation especially for its technical department and was a commercial success. She then made an appearance as a cheating girlfriend and a spirit in Yoosuf Shafeeu directed horror film Edhathuru (2004) which revolves around eight friends who go on a picnic to an island and how they fight to survive the horrific incidents that befall them. The film was appreciated by critics, specifically praising its sound effect and was a commercial success. Didi received her first Gaumee Film Award nomination as the Best Supporting Actress for her "authentic" performance as the cunning and unfaithful girlfriend who is having an extramarital affair with a married man in Abdul Faththaah's critically praised romantic film Vehey Vaarey Therein (2003). Featuring Yoosuf Shafeeu, Jamsheedha Ahmed, Mohamed Shavin, Amira Ismail and Aminath Rasheedha in crucial roles, the film narrates the story of unrequited love, and proved to be one of the highest-grossing Maldivian films of the year. She rose to widespread prominence in the television industry with her performance as a colleague seducing her friend's husband in the Arifa Ibrahim-directed critically acclaimed television series, Vairoalhi Ahves Sirrun (2005) which revolves around two best-friends involved in extra-marital affairs and who fail to practice their duty as husband and wife. Starring alongside Niuma Mohamed, Ahmed Asim, Aminath Rasheedha and Mariyam Shakeela, the series was listed as one of the most successful television series.

In 2011, Didi played the role of Afiya, the wife from an underprivileged family grabbing every chance to sustain their basic needs, in the Moomin Fuad-directed crime tragedy drama Loodhifa. Featuring an ensemble cast, the film deals with modern social issues in society told from the different perspectives of the characters. Made on a budget of MVR 600,000, the film was declared a commercial failure though it received wide critical acclaim. Her portrayal garnered her several award nominations, including a Gaumee Film Award nomination for Best Supporting Actress and a Maldives Film Award nomination as Best Supporting Actor. She next starred in a small role as a nurse in Abdul Faththaah's romantic film Love Story (2012) alongside Ali Seezan, Aishath Rishmy and Amira Ismail.

In 2018, Didi was featured alongside Mohamed Jumayyil, Mariyam Majudha and Nuzuhath Shuaib in Ali Shifau's family drama Vakin Loabin (2018). The film tells a story of a young couple’s divorce and its impact on everyone involved. Upon release, the film met with a positive response from critics, specifically praising the screenplay for toning down its melodrama and breaking from the stereotypes of its genre, and it was a commercial success.

Media image
In 2012, she was ranked at the seventh position in the list of "Best Actresses in Maldives" compiled by Haveeru.

Filmography

Feature film

Television

Short film

Accolades

References 

Living people
People from Malé
21st-century Maldivian actresses
Maldivian film actresses
Year of birth missing (living people)